Alfons Gorbach (2 September 1898 – 31 July 1972) was an Austrian politician of the conservative People's Party (ÖVP). He served as Chancellor of Austria from 1961 to 1964.

Life
Born in Imst, Tyrol, Gorbach served in the Austro-Hungarian Army at the Italian Front in World War I, was severely wounded in the 1917 Battle of Caporetto and lost a leg. After the war he took up a political career in the First Austrian Republic. He joined the Christian Social Party and from 1929 to 1932 was a municipal councillor in Graz, Styria. In 1937 he was appointed a minister (Landesrat) in the Styrian state government, However, upon the Austrian Anschluss to Nazi Germany in March 1938, Gorbach was dismissed and held as a political prisoner at Dachau concentration camp from 1938–42, and again at Flossenburg from 1944 until the end of World War II.

After the war, Gorbach joined the newly established Austrian People's Party, and upon the 1945 legislative election became third president of the National Council parliament, an office he held until 1953 and again from 1956 to 1961. When a deceiving outcome in the 1959 election launched an internal party debate over aging ÖVP Chancellor Julius Raab, Gorbach, backed by the Styrian regional association, succeeded him as party chairman and on 11 April 1961 also as Austrian chancellor.

Chancellor Gorbach led his party into the 1962 election with an anti-Socialist campaign, only to continue the grand coalition with the SPÖ under Vice-Chancellor Bruno Pittermann afterwards. The People's Party achieved a slightly better result and became the strongest party five seats ahead of the Socialists, however, it failed to reach an absolute majority. After three years as chancellor, conciliatory Gorbach had to vacate his position in favour of the less pragmatic ÖVP "reformers" around his successor Josef Klaus. He returned to the National Council where he kept his mandate until 1970. In 1965 he unsuccessfully ran against Franz Jonas in the Austrian presidential election.

Gorbach remained honorary chairman of the Austrian People's Party. He died in Graz, Styria, aged 73.

References

External links

 Wiener Zeitung biography (German)
  
 Austrian Parliament official biography (German)

1898 births
1972 deaths
20th-century Chancellors of Austria
Austro-Hungarian military personnel of World War I
Members of the National Council (Austria)
Chancellors of Austria
Austrian People's Party politicians
Candidates for President of Austria